Hippler is a German surname. Notable people with the surname include:

Fritz Hippler (1909–2002), German film director
Werner Hippler (born 1970), German-born Canadian player of American football

See also
 Hipler

German-language surnames